Ágnes Triffa (born 18 January 1987) is a former Hungarian handball goalkeeper for the Hungarian national team.

She made her international debut on 2 June 2006 against Argentina, and took part on the World Championship in 2009.

Achievements
Nemzeti Bajnokság I:
Runner-up: 2010, 2011
Magyar Kupa:
Silver Medalist: 2011
Bronze Medalist: 2008
Slovenian National Championship:
Winner: 2009
Slovenian Cup:
Winner: 2009
EHF CupWinner:'' 2016

References

External links

1987 births
Living people
People from Gyula
Hungarian female handball players
Expatriate handball players
Hungarian expatriate sportspeople in Slovenia
Békéscsabai Előre NKSE players
Sportspeople from Békés County